Pabbi Railway Station is located in Pabbi village Khudrezai  Nowshera district of Khyber Pakhtunkhwa province of the Pakistan. Pabbi Station is walking distance from the famous road, The Grand Trunk Road (G.T. Road). The railway line itself runs parallel to The G.T. Road. Pabbi railway station was once one of the first major train stops for trains originating from Peshawar.

See also
 List of railway stations in Pakistan
 Pakistan Railways

References

Railway stations in Nowshera District
Railway stations on Karachi–Peshawar Line (ML 1)